EPNS may refer to:

 Electroplated nickel silver
 English Place-Name Society

See also 
 EPN (disambiguation)